Gmina Chybie is a rural gmina (administrative district) in Cieszyn County, Silesian Voivodeship, in southern Poland, in the historical region of Cieszyn Silesia. Its seat is the village of Chybie.

Villages

Gmina Chybie contains the villages and settlements of Chybie, Frelichów, Mnich, Zaborze and Zarzecze.

Neighbouring gminas
Gmina Chybie is bordered by the gminas of Czechowice-Dziedzice, Goczałkowice-Zdrój, Jasienica, Skoczów and Strumień.

Notable people
Henryk Machalica (1930–2003), actor
Bogumił Kobiela (1931–1969), theatre actor
Ryszard Staniek (born 1971), footballer

Twin towns – sister cities

Gmina Chybie is twinned with:
 Těrlicko, Czech Republic

References

External links
 Gmina Chybie - Official site

Chybie
Cieszyn County
Cieszyn Silesia